Gulliver Ralston (born 1978) is a British musician living in Oxford, England.

Education 
Ralston was a chorister in the choir of Christ Church Cathedral, Oxford. After completing his secondary education at Eton College he read music at New College, Oxford, where he held an alto choral scholarship. After graduating he won a graduate award to write a D.Phil on Richard Wagner at St Peter's College, Oxford where he was Director of Musical Performance from 2003 to 2005.

Musical career 
Gulliver Ralston is Artistic Director of the Brinkburn Festival, Director of Music at the University of Roehampton, and Director of Music at Oxford's University Church. Gulliver studied music as a choral scholar at New College, Oxford, moving to St. Peter’s College to complete his doctorate on Richard Wagner with the philosopher Roger Scruton, FBA. In 2014, he made his debut as a conductor with the Royal Northern Sinfonia and Patricia Rozario in Mahler’s Symphony No. 4. 
 
He teaches nineteenth and twentieth-century music history in Oxford, where he is also tutor for the Sarah Lawrence Programme at Wadham College.  He lectures for the Royal Academy of Arts and the Oxford Lieder Festival, and has written for The New Culture Forum, Literary Review, Eighteenth Century Music, Early Music and Wagner.

Gulliver has also been assistant conductor with The National Orchestra of Lebanon and directed The National Orchestra of Malta and The Band of Instruments.  He has been musical director for productions of Hansel and Gretel, Così fan tutte, Die Entführung, Il barbiere di Siviglia, Le nozze di Figaro, La Bohème, Noye’s Fludde and Eight Songs for a Mad King.  In 2014, he conducted the European premier of John Peel and M.D. Usher’s opera Neron Kaisar.

Gulliver works extensively with young voices. His recording with the Hildegard Choir of newly discovered works by Vaughan Williams and Liszt received glowing reviews from The Liszt Society and The Classical Review, and he gives frequent workshops for choirs.  In 2011 he was invited by the Zimbabwe Academy of Music in Bulawayo to work with over 1600 children across Zimbabwe, and the educational programme at the Brinkburn Festival involves the 2500 pupils spread across the five campuses of the Northumberland Church of England Academy.

After an invitation by West End star Peter Straker, Gulliver joined his band as the pianist, alongside guitarist Mike Allison.  Gulliver has a love of cabaret and performs the songs of Gershwin, Noel Coward, and Tom Lehrer, often with baritone Colin Baldy.  In 2015, he taught a course on songwriting at the University of Roehampton, led by poet, writer and librettist David Harsent.

Since 2013, Ralston has been Chairman of the Scottish charity Glen Art which helps those from a military background return to civilian life.

On 21 September 2016, he performed alongside Dillie Keane from comedy cabaret trio Fascinating Aida at the Theatre Royal Windsor.

References

External links 
 Handmade Opera website
 University Church website
 Brinkburn Festival website

1978 births
English conductors (music)
British male conductors (music)
Living people
People educated at Eton College
Alumni of New College, Oxford
Alumni of St Peter's College, Oxford
21st-century British conductors (music)
21st-century British male musicians